Zoom is a 2016 Indian Kannada romantic comedy film directed by Prashant Raj starring Ganesh and Radhika Pandit in the lead roles. The supporting cast features  Sadhu Kokila and Kashinath. The music is scored by S. Thaman and cinematography is by Santhosh Rai Pathaje. The film released on 1 July 2016 across Karnataka and other countries. The movie is a remake of 1961 movie Lover Come Back. The director remade the movie in Tamil in 2023 as Kick.

Cast

Soundtrack

References

External links
 

2016 films
Films about advertising
Indian romantic comedy films
2016 romantic comedy films
2010s Kannada-language films
Films scored by Thaman S
Films shot in Italy
Films directed by Prashant Raj
Kannada films remade in other languages